Arnold Saul (May 30, 1924 – April 6, 2012) was an amateur American tennis player in the 1940s and 1950s and tennis coach.

At the 1949 Cincinnati Masters, Saul was seeded No. 3 and reached the singles final before losing to James Brink of Seattle in four sets (4–6, 8–6, 4–6, 0–6). He also reached the doubles final in Cincinnati that year, with partner Gil Shea. Saul and Shea lost in that final to eventual International Tennis Hall of Famer Tony Trabert and Andy Paton.

Saul played his collegiate tennis at the University of Southern California. In 1948, he teamed with Robert Perez to reach the doubles final of the NCAA Championships before falling to Fred Kovaleski and Bernard Bartzen of William & Mary College.

References

American male tennis players
USC Trojans men's tennis players
1924 births
2012 deaths